East of Suez is a 1925 American silent drama film directed by Raoul Walsh and starring Pola Negri. It is based on a play, East of Suez (1922), by W. Somerset Maugham. The film was produced by Famous Players-Lasky and distributed by Paramount Pictures.

Plot
As described in a review in a film magazine, after being raised in England, Daisy Forbes (Negri) returns to China, the country of her birth. She discovers that her father has recently died and that she has become a social outcast, owing to the public revelation that the oriental nurse who raised her was actually her mother. Daisy is in love with George Tevis (Lowe), a nephew of the British Consul (Beery), but she is disappointed by George when he is persuaded by his uncle to renounce her in favor of a diplomatic career. Lee Tai (Kamiyama), a sinister mandarin, uses drugs and hypnotism to kidnap Daisy; she is rescued by Englishman Harry Anderson (Fellowes), whom she soon marries out of desperation. When Anderson discovers that Daisy is an ostracized half caste and that he is now shunned, he bitterly regrets their marriage. Finally deciding to defy conventions and marry Daisy, George searches her out only to find that she is a married woman. Anderson forbids George to see Daisy again, saying that he will kill him, but George defies the ban and meets her at her house to say goodbye. Before he can shoot George, Anderson drinks wine that was poisoned at the orders of Lee Tai and dies. Tevis takes Daisy back to England, and Lee Tai is executed according to Chinese law.

Cast

Preservation
With no prints of East of Suez located in any film archives, it is a lost film.

References

External links

Posters at one and two

1925 films
American silent feature films
Films directed by Raoul Walsh
Lost American films
Films based on British novels
Paramount Pictures films
1925 drama films
Silent American drama films
Films based on works by W. Somerset Maugham
American black-and-white films
1925 lost films
Lost drama films
1920s American films